Alaçam is a town and district of Samsun Province, Turkey.

Alaçam means "variegated pine" in Turkish. It may refer to:

 Alaçam, Mut, a village in Mut district of Mersin Province
 Alaçam, the brand of bottled water marketed by Nestlé Waters in Turkey
 Alaçam, Dursunbey
 Alaçam, Kestel